The 2018 African Cross Country Championships was the fifth edition of the international cross country running competition for African athletes organised by the Confederation of African Athletics. It was held on 17 March in Chlef, Algeria – the first time a North African nation had hosted the event since its re-launch in 2011. There were five races on the program: 10 km for senior men, 10 km for senior women, 8 km for junior men, 6 km for junior women, and an 8 km mixed relay.

Kenya again dominated the podium at the competition, taking the top two spots in the senior men's, senior women's, and junior men's races, as well as runner-up in the mixed relay. The 21-year-old Alfred Barkach had the first major win of his career in the senior men's race and 18-year-old Celliphine Chespol took the women's title, adding senior international honours to her world steeplechase titles at under-18 and under-20 level. Rhonex Kipruto won the men's junior title and went on to become 10,000 metres World U20 Champion later that year. Girmawit Gebrzihair claimed Ethiopia's sole individual title in the junior women's race, though her physical appearance raised questions about her eligibility for the under-18 category.

Medallists

Results

Senior men

Senior women

Junior men

Junior women

Mixed relay

See also
2018 Asian Cross Country Championships
2018 European Cross Country Championships

References

Results
African cross-country championships, Chlef (Algeria) 17/03/2018. Africa Athle. Retrieved 2019-08-04.

African Cross Country Championships
International athletics competitions hosted by Algeria
African Cross Country
African Cross Country
African Cross Country
African Cross Country
Chlef Province